Ana de Sousa (born 18 August 1969) is a Portuguese archer. She competed at the 1988 Summer Olympics and the 1992 Summer Olympics.

References

1969 births
Living people
Portuguese female archers
Olympic archers of Portugal
Archers at the 1988 Summer Olympics
Archers at the 1992 Summer Olympics
Sportspeople from Lisbon